Rays Fork is a  long 3rd order tributary to Richardson Creek in Union County, North Carolina.

Course
Rays Fork rises in a pond about 3 miles southeast of Rock Rest and then flows northeast and curves northwest to join Richardson Creek about 1 mile northeast of Monroe, North Carolina.

Watershed
Rays Fork Creek drains  of area, receives about 48.6 in/year of precipitation, has a wetness index of 433.74, and is about 38% forested.

References

Rivers of North Carolina
Rivers of Union County, North Carolina